is a funicular railway station on the Hakone Tozan Cable Car in the town of Hakone, Ashigarashimo District, Kanagawa Prefecture, Japan. It is 0.24 rail kilometers from the Hakone Tozan Cable Car Line's terminus at Gōra Station.

History
Kōen-Shimo Station opened on December 1, 1921 with the opening of the Hakone Tozan Cable Car Line. It was named after "The downside of Gora Park".

Lines
Hakone Tozan Railway
Hakone Tozan Cable Car

Layout
Kōen-Shimo Station has two opposed side platforms serving a single track. The station is unattended.

External links
Hakone Tozan Railway (Japanese)

Railway stations in Kanagawa Prefecture
Railway stations in Japan opened in 1921
Buildings and structures in Hakone, Kanagawa